Pinus praetermissa, commonly known as McVaugh's pine, is a species of conifer in the family Pinaceae.  Originally classified as a variety of Pinus oocarpa (P. oocarpa var. microphylla) in 1909, it was promoted to specific status in 1990 after further study.

It is found only in western Mexico.

References

praetermissa
Least concern plants
Taxonomy articles created by Polbot
Endemic flora of Mexico
Plants described in 1909